John DiFronzo (December 13, 1928 – May 27, 2018), nicknamed "No Nose", was an American mobster and the reputed former boss of the Chicago Outfit.

Biography
DiFronzo, a former enforcer and caporegime, first appeared with a criminal record in 1949. He got the nickname "No Nose" because he sliced off part of his nose while jumping through a window during a 1949 clothing store burglary. Reportedly, the police gave him back the missing part which was almost perfectly restored. In 1950, DiFronzo served two years in prison for burglary.  
DiFronzo was a suspect in the unsolved 1952 murder of Charles Gross, a West Side politician with suspected ties to organized crime. He was a member of the Three Minute Gang, and identified as a member of a loansharking operation along with former Chicago police officers Albert Sarno and Chris Cardi in 1964. Imprisoned syndicate leader Joseph Aiuppa chose DiFronzo to head criminal operations in Chicago's western suburbs over acting syndicate boss Joseph Ferriola. Eventually, he became one of several de facto leaders running The Outfit in Chicago.

His brother, Peter DiFronzo, a made-man, was convicted of warehouse burglary in 1963.

In 1993, DiFronzo was convicted along with Chicago boss Samuel "Black Sam" Carlisi, his gambling capo Donald "The Wizard of Odds" Angelini, and four other men of federal racketeering charges for attempting to subterfuge gambling operations at the Rincon Reservation near San Diego. The 1993 conviction was reversed on appeal, however, and DiFronzo was released from prison in 1994.

In 2009, DiFronzo, Rudy Fratto and several others were named in a civil lawsuit by Joseph Fosco, the son of late Teamsters treasurer Armando Fosco, alleged to have tried to extort $400,000 from Fosco.

DiFronzo died from complications of Alzheimer's disease on May 27, 2018.

Further reading 
Capeci, Jerry. The Complete Idiot's Guide to the Mafia. Indianapolis: Alpha Books, 2002. 
Mannion, James. 101 Things You Didn't Know About The Mafia: The Lowdown on Dons, Wiseguys, Squealers and Backstabbers. Avon, Massachusetts: Adams Media, 2005. 
Wilkins, David E. American Indian Politics and the American Political System. Oxford: Rowman & Littleton Publishers, 2006. 
United States. Congress. House. Committee on Interior and Insular Affairs. Implementation and Enforcement of the Indian Gaming Regulatory ACT, Public Law 100-497. 1992.  
Devito, Carlo. The Encyclopedia of International Organized Crime. New York: Facts On File, Inc., 2005. 
Sifakis, Carl. The Mafia Encyclopedia. New York: Da Capo Press, 2005. 
Coen, Jeff. Family Secrets: The Case That Crippled the Chicago Mob. Chicago: Chicago Review Press, 2009. 
Complete John DiFronzo Mob Article Archives (TheChicagoSyndicate.com)

References

1928 births
2018 deaths
American crime bosses
American gangsters of Italian descent
Chicago Outfit bosses
Chicago Outfit mobsters
Criminals from Chicago
People convicted of racketeering
Deaths from dementia in Illinois
Deaths from Alzheimer's disease